1900 in the Philippines details events of note that happened in the Philippines in the year 1900.

Incumbents

First Philippine Republic
President: Emilio Aguinaldo

U.S. Military Government
Governor:
 Elwell Stephen Otis (until May 5)
 Arthur MacArthur, Jr. (starting May 5)

Events

February
 February 2 – The Daily Bulletin (now Manila Bulletin) is established as the second oldest existing English language newspaper.

April
 April 7 – The Battle of Cagayan de Misamis was fought between the Filipino troops under General Nicolas Capistrano and American troops under Colonel Edward Godwin.

May
 May 14 – Captain Walter B. Elliott with 80 men proceeded to begin the Battle of Agusan Hill against about 500 guerillas who were entrenched on a hill with 200 rifles and shotguns.

June
 June 4 – Filipino troops under Colonel Apolinar Velez win a decisive victory against 100 American troops at the Battle of Makahambus Hill.

Holidays
As a former colony of Spanish Empire and being a catholic country, the following were considered holidays:
 January 1 – New Year's Day
 April 12 – Maundy Thursday
 April 13 – Good Friday
 December 25 – Christmas Day

Births
 November 11 – Narciso Ramos, former Secretary of Foreign Affairs (d. 1986)

Deaths
 March 10 – Delfina Herbosa de Natividad, one of the three women who seamed together the Flag of the Philippines (b. 1879)

References